= Bahujana Communist Party =

The Bahujana Communist Party (BCP) is a political party in Telangana in India. The party is led by K.K. Niyogi. In 2019 the party joined hands with other left forces in the struggle against the NRC.
